Geresh (with variant English spellings) is a cantillation mark found in the Torah, Haftarah, and other books of the Hebrew Bible. It is most often found together with the Kadma, in which case the pair is known as Kadma-V'Azla, but it can also be found independently, in which case it is referred to as Azla Geresh or simply as Geresh.

The Geresh occurs 1733 times in the Torah in the Kadma-V'Azla pair, and 1112 times separately.

The Hebrew word  translates into English as driving out.

Total occurrences

Melody

References 

Cantillation marks